Sergei Vladimirovich Nekrasov (born 29 January 1973) is a Russian former football player.

Honours
 Russian Premier League runner-up: 1994.
 Russian Premier League bronze: 1993, 1997.
 Russian Cup winner: 1995.
 Russian Cup runner-up: 1997, 1999.

International career
Nekrasov played his only game for Russia on 11 November 1998 in a friendly against Brazil.

Personal life
His younger brother Igor Nekrasov also played football professionally.

References
  Profile
 

1973 births
Footballers from Moscow
Living people
Russian footballers
Russia under-21 international footballers
Russia international footballers
Association football defenders
FC Dynamo Moscow players
FC Anzhi Makhachkala players
FC Khimki players
FC Zvezda Irkutsk players
Russian Premier League players